John Matthew Wilson Young (17 December 1822; Durham – 4 March 1897; Lincoln) was an English organist. He was elder brother to William James Young (1835; Durham - 1913; Lancashire), also a well-known English organist. John M.W. Young was buried in the cemetery at East Gate in Lincoln. He married Augusta Frushard (1820; Lambeth - 1902; Lincoln), youngest daughter of Philip Frushard (13 October 1783 India - 5 July 1837 Durham), the Governor of Durham Gaol, and Anna Maria Pewsey his wife, on 8 July 1851 at St. Paul's Church, Deptford, Kent.

Career
He was successively:
A chorister at Durham Cathedral
Assistant Organist of Durham Cathedral, ? to 1850
Organist of Lincoln Cathedral, 1850 to 1895

Publications
The psalter, as used in Lincoln Cathedral, John Matthew Wilson Young, Henry Wollaston Hutton, George John Bennett, W.K. Morton & Sons, 1912

Children
Augusta Anna Maria Young (1852–1921)
John Frederick Sebastion Young (1853–1873)
Philip Frushard Young (1855–?)
Edward Muir Young (ca. 1857–1915)
Alfred Hamilton Frushard Young (1858–1918)
Walter Frushard Young (ca. 1859–1875)
Rosetta Catherine Young (1860–ca. 1914)
Ada Frushard Young (1862–1943)
Richard Samuel Frushard Young (1868–1894)

References

1822 births
1897 deaths
Cathedral organists
19th-century classical musicians
19th-century organists